Mulberry Hill is a historic plantation house located near Edenton, Chowan County, North Carolina. It was built about 1810, and is a -story, three bay, Federal style brick dwelling with a side-hall plan.

It was listed on the National Register of Historic Places in 1976.

References

External links

Historic American Buildings Survey in North Carolina
Plantation houses in North Carolina
Houses on the National Register of Historic Places in North Carolina
Federal architecture in North Carolina
Houses completed in 1810
Houses in Chowan County, North Carolina
National Register of Historic Places in Chowan County, North Carolina